Spin Control may refer to:

 Spin Control - see Spin (public relations) and Political spin.
 Spin Control (Apple Developer Tools) a performance tool used for monitoring hang activity in software programs
 Spin Control (novel) by Chris Moriarty